Bárbaro Erisbel Arruebarrena Escalante (born March 25, 1990) is a Cuban professional baseball shortstop for the Algodoneros de Guasave of the Mexican Pacific League and the Cocodrilos de Matanzas of the Cuban National Series. Arruebarrena played for Cienfuegos in the Cuban National Series from 2008 through 2012, and played for the Cuba national baseball team in international competition, before defecting from Cuba in 2013 to pursue a Major League Baseball career. He played in Major League Baseball (MLB) with the Los Angeles Dodgers in 2014 before a poor attitude and various violations of team rules led to his banishment to the low minors and eventual release. In 2019, he became the first ex-MLB player to return to the Cuban baseball league system after defecting from the country. He now plays for the Cocodrilos de Matanzas of the Cuban National Series, as well as the Cuba national baseball team.

Professional baseball career

Cuban career
Arruebarrena played for the Cienfuegos team in the Cuban National Series from 2008-2012 and was a member of the Cuba national baseball team in the 2011 Pan American Games, 2012 Haarlem Baseball Week, the 2013 World Baseball Classic, and the 2013 World Port Tournament.

In September 2013, Arruebarrena tried to defect from Cuba, and was barred from participating in the 53rd Cuban National Series as a result. In November, he successfully defected from Cuba, established residency in Haiti and began working out in the Dominican Republic for Major League scouts.

Los Angeles Dodgers

On February 12, 2014, it was reported that Arruebarrena had reached a preliminary agreement on a contract with the Los Angeles Dodgers. On February 22, 2014, the Dodgers announced that they had signed him to a 5-year contract worth a reported $25 million, with a $7.5 million signing bonus. He was assigned to the AA Chattanooga Lookouts to start his career and was called up to the Dodgers on May 21, 2014. He made his MLB debut as the starting shortstop for the Dodgers on May 23, 2014. He struck out three times in that game. He recorded his first hit the next day, on a single to center field off of David Buchanan of the Philadelphia Phillies.

On July 26, 2014, Arruebarrena started a massive brawl between the Albuquerque Isotopes and Reno Aces in an AAA game. The day before, he had spent a long time circling the bases after hitting a 3-run homer, and at his first at-bat, he was nearly hit by a pitch. After he struck out, the opposing catcher "brushed him" as he threw to third base, Arruebarrena "shoved" the catcher, and both benches cleared. He was optioned to the Rancho Cucamonga Quakes the next day. He played in 68 games in the minors in 2014 between three different levels and hit .259. In 22 games with the Dodgers, he was primarily used as a defensive replacement but also had eight hits in 41 at-bats, for a .195 average.

Arruebarrena was designated for assignment on December 31, 2014. He cleared waivers and accepted an outright assignment to the Dodgers new AAA team, the Oklahoma City Dodgers. He was also invited to attend major league spring training as a non-roster player.

Arruebarrena was not assigned to any minor league teams and began 2015 in extended spring training in Arizona. On May 21, 2015, he was suspended indefinitely by the team, without pay, for disciplinary reasons. After he appealed to the commissioner's office, the suspension was reduced to 30 days. He spent the entire season in the minor leagues, first with three games for the Arizona League Dodgers, then 12 for the Rancho Cucamonga Quakes before spending 38 games with the Tulsa Drillers. Overall, he hit .299 in 53 games with 3 homers and 15 RBI.

Arruebarrena returned to Tulsa to start the 2016 season. In 17 games, he hit only .182. On May 4, 2016, the Dodgers announced that he would be suspended for the rest of the season for "repeated failure to comply with the terms of his contract." In the 2017 season, he was not assigned to any minor league rosters until late in the year, and only appeared in eight games for the Arizona League Dodgers, where he hit .519 (14 hits in 27 at-bats). Arruebarrena did not appear in any games for the organization in 2018, and was eventually released in late July.

Return to Cuba
In 2019, Arruebarrena repatriated to Cuba and joined the Cocodrilos de Matanzas of the Cuban National Series. He thus became the first Cuban ex-MLB player to return to the Cuban baseball league system. With Matanzas' victory in the 2019/20 CNS, he also became the first ex-MLB player to win a domestic Series title after repatriating.

Arruebarrena played for the Cuban national team in the 2023 World Baseball Classic.

See also

List of baseball players who defected from Cuba

References

External links

Cuban baseball statistics

1990 births
Living people
Defecting Cuban baseball players
Los Angeles Dodgers players
Elefantes de Cienfuegos players
Arizona League Dodgers players
Rancho Cucamonga Quakes players
Chattanooga Lookouts players
Albuquerque Isotopes players
2013 World Baseball Classic players
2023 World Baseball Classic players
Major League Baseball shortstops
Major League Baseball players from Cuba
Cuban expatriate baseball players in the United States
Tulsa Drillers players
Pan American Games medalists in baseball
Pan American Games bronze medalists for Cuba
Baseball players at the 2011 Pan American Games
Medalists at the 2011 Pan American Games
Cocodrilos de Matanzas players
Algodoneros de Guasave players
Cuban expatriate baseball players in Mexico
People from Cienfuegos
Cuban expatriate baseball players in Nicaragua